Open Data Science Conference, or ODSC, is an annual event held in Boston, San Francisco, Brazil, London, and India. The purpose of ODSC events is to discuss data science and machine learning topics, as well as provide training sessions.

History
Open Data Science Conference was founded in 2015, with the first inaugural event held on May 30, 2015. Since then, the event has grown rapidly, from 2,000 participants in 2017 to 8,230 registered attendees in 2020.

References

Annual events
Technology conferences
Business conferences
Web-related conferences
Free-software conferences